Cochlefelis burmanicus is a species of catfish in the family Ariidae. It was described by Francis Day in 1870, originally under the genus Arius. It is known from brackish and freshwaters in Myanmar and Thailand.

Cochlefelis burmanicus has been rated as Least Concern by the IUCN redlist.

References

Ariidae
Fish described in 1870
IUCN Red List least concern species